Invicta is the fourteenth studio album by the British progressive rock band the Enid, released in 2012. Invicta is the second album in a planned trilogy that began with its predecessor, 2010's Journey's End.

Track listing

Personnel
The Enid
Robert John Godfrey - keyboards
Max Read - guitar, vocals
Dave Storey - drums, percussion
Jason Ducker - guitars
Joe Payne - vocals
Nicholas Willes - bass, percussion

Production
Max Read - production, mixing, engineer
Jason Ducker - engineer
Robert John Godfrey - production
Joe Payne - lyrics
Bob Read - cover art

References

The Enid albums
2012 albums